Line 5, also known as the Yellow Line from its color on the system map, is a rapid transit line of the Mexico City Metro network. It travels  along the boroughs of  Gustavo A. Madero, Cuauhtémoc and Venustiano Carranza in northern, northeastern and eastern Mexico City, serving thirteen stations. The line was inaugurated on 19 December 1981, going from Pantitlán to Consulado station. In 1982, the line was expanded twice, first from Consulado to La Raza station on 1 July, and later from La Raza to Politécnico station on 30 August. 

Line 5 was built by Mexican construction company Empresas ICA and it runs at grade and underground levels. The interchange stations are Instituto del Petróleo (Line 6), La Raza (Line 3), Consulado (Line 4), Oceanía (Line B), and Pantitlán (Lines 1, 9 and A). The line serves the Mexico City International Airport (AICM) at Terminal Aérea station and connects with other transport systems in the city, including the trolleybus, the Metrobús and the Mexibús systems.

In 2019, Line 5 had a total ridership of 86,512,999 passengers, averaging 237,021 passengers per day and making it one of the least used lines on the network.

History and construction
Line 5 of the Mexico City Metro was built in early 1980s by Cometro, a subsidiary of Empresas ICA. Pantitlán, Oceanía, Aragón, Eduardo Molina and Consulado stations were built at-grade level, while Hangares and Terminal Aérea were built underground. Between Consulado and Eduardo Molina a station named Simón Bolivar was planned but never built due to budget constraints.

The line was expanded northbound to La Raza station, in Gustavo A. Madero, slightly passing through the Cuauhtémoc borough at Misterios station. Valle Gómez and Misterios stations were built underground, while La Raza was built at-grade level. The expansion was opened on 1 July 1982. The second and last expansion was northbound toward Politécnico station, in Gustavo A. Madero with all the stations built at grade, and it was opened on 30 August 1982.

During the early excavations, a road that connected Tenochtitlan with the Tepeyac hill was found in the Valle Gómez–Misterios stretch. The road was built with materials dated from the Mesoamerican Postclassic Period. In Peñon de los Baños (near Terminal Aérea station), workers found the remains of mamuts, bisons, horses, camels, birds and fishes, as well as a Teotihuacan settlement. 

In 2015, during an evening with heavy rain and hail, two trains crashed while both were going toward Politécnico station. One person indirectly died and twelve others resulted injured. In 2021, the whole line ceased operations for three days after a fire occurred on the STC's Central Control Center.

Planned expansion
During the 1980s and 1990s, it was proposed to expand Line 5 northbound to the municipality of Tlalnepantla de Baz, in the State of Mexico. The expansion was proposed again for the 2018 master plan, and if built it would connect with the Tren Suburbano's Tlalnepantla Station.

Rolling stock

Line 5 has had different types of rolling stock. The MP-68 trains were built in 1968 in France by Alstom and they were modeled after the MP 59 trains on the Paris Metro. With a service life of 25 years, all the MP-68 trains were restored and refurbished by Bombardier in 1993. The second type, the NM-73 model, were built in 1973 in Mexico by Concarril with the supervision of Alstom. Both models received further restoration works in 2016.

Route
Politécnico station, the northern terminus of the line, lies next to Eje Central Avenue (at the section named 100 Metros Avenue), near the National Polytechnic Institute main campus. The line heads southeast along the avenue to Instituto del Petróleo station, serving the Mexican Petroleum Institute. The track continues to Autobuses del Norte station, located next to the city's . As the line reaches La Raza station, it moves from Eje Central to Circuito Interior (at the section named Río Consulado Avenue), entering the first tunnel toward two underground stations: Misterios, near , and Valle Gómez, in the neighborhood of the same name.

The line goes back to the surface to avoid a conflict with the underground  and reaches Consulado station. It continues along the avenue to Eduardo Molina and Aragón stations until the intersection of Circuito Interior and Oceanía Avenue where Oceanía station is located. Circuito Interior changes its section name from Río Consulado Avenue to Puerto Aéreo Boulevard. From there, the line goes under another tunnel toward Terminal Aérea station, which serves the city's airport. The track moves from Puerto Aéreo Boulevard to Eje 1 Norte, at the section named Fuerza Aérea Avenue, and arrives at Hangares station, located next to the airport's hangars. The line continues and leaves the tunnel; Eje 1 Norte changes to the next section, named Miguel Lebrija Avenue, and reaches the southeastern terminal of Pantitlán, where it connects with three other metro lines.

Station list 

The stations from east to north-west: 
{| class="wikitable" rules="all"
|-
!rowspan="2" | No.
!rowspan="2" | Station
!rowspan="2" | Date opened
!rowspan="2" | Level
!colspan="2" | Distance (km)
!rowspan="2" | Connection
!rowspan="2" | Location
|-
!style="font-size: 65%;"|Betweenstations
!style="font-size: 65%;"|Total
|-
|style="background: #;"|01
|Politécnico 
| rowspan="3" |August 30, 1982
| rowspan="4" |Ground-level, underground access
|style="text-align:right;"|-
|style="text-align:right;"|0.0
|
 Politécnico
 Routes: 23, 103
  Line 8: Politécnico Oriente stop, Politécnico Poniente stop
|rowspan="4"|Gustavo A. Madero
|-
|style="background: #;"|02
|Instituto del Petróleo
|style="text-align:right;"|1.3
|style="text-align:right;"|1.3
|
  Line 6
  Line 6: Instituto del Petróleo station (at distance)
 Routes: 23, 27-A, 103
  Line 1: Instituto del Petróleo stop (north–south route)
  Line 8: Montevideo stop (at distance)
|-
|style="background: #;"|03
|Autobuses del Norte 
|style="text-align:right;"|1.2
|style="text-align:right;"|2.5
|
 North Bus Terminal
 Routes: 23, 103
  Line 1: Central del Norte stop
 Route: 15-A
|-
|style="background: #;"|04
|La Raza 
| rowspan="3" |July 1, 1982
|style="text-align:right;"|1.1
|style="text-align:right;"|3.7
|
  Line 3
 La Raza
  Line 1: La Raza station
  Line 3: La Raza station
  Line IV: La Raza station (under construction)
 Routes: 11-A (at distance), 12 (at distance), 23, 27-A, 103
  Line 1: La Raza stop (north–south route)
 Routes: 7-D (at distance), 20-C, 20-D
|-
|style="background: #;"|05
|Misterios
| rowspan="2" |Underground, trench
|style="text-align:right;"|1.0
|style="text-align:right;"|4.7
|
  Line 7: Misterios station (at distance)
 Route: 200
  Line 5: Río Consulado stop (at distance)
 Route: 20-A
|Gustavo A. Madero / Cuauhtémoc
|-
|style="background: #;"|06
|Valle Gómez
|style="text-align:right;"|1.2
|style="text-align:right;"|5.9
|
 Route: 200
 Route: 5-A (at distance), 20-A
|rowspan="4"|Gustavo A. Madero / Venustiano Carranza
|-
|style="background: #;"|07
|Consulado
| rowspan="7" |December 19, 1981
| rowspan="4" |Ground-level, underground access
|style="text-align:right;"|0.8
|style="text-align:right;"|6.7
|
  Line 4
  Line 5: Río Consulado station (at distance)
 Routes: 37, 200 (at distance)
 Routes: 5-A, 20-A, 20-B
|-
|style="background: #;"|08
|Eduardo Molina
|style="text-align:right;"|0.9
|style="text-align:right;"|7.6
|
  Line 5: Río Consulado station (at distance)
 Route: 200
 Route: 20-B
|-
|style="background: #;"|09
|Aragón
|style="text-align:right;"|1.0
|style="text-align:right;"|8.6
|
 Route: 200
 Route: 20-B
|-
|style="background: #;"|10
|Oceanía 
|style="text-align:right;"|1.4
|style="text-align:right;"|10.0
|
<li>  Line B
<li> Routes: 43, 200
<li>  Line 4: Oceanía stop
<li> Routes: 10-D, 20-B
|rowspan="4"|Venustiano Carranza
|-
|style="background: #;"|11
|Terminal Aérea
| rowspan="2" |Underground, trench
|style="text-align:right;"|1.2
|style="text-align:right;"|11.3
|
<li>  Mexico City Airport
<li>  Aerotren (at distance)
<li>  Line 4 (airport branch): Terminal 1 station (at distance)
<li> Routes: 43, 200
<li>  Line 4: Terminal Aérea stop (east–west route)
<li> Route: 20-B
|-
|style="background: #;"|12
|Hangares
|style="text-align:right;"|1.4
|style="text-align:right;"|12.6
|
<li> Route: 11-C
|-
|style="background: #;"|13
|Pantitlán 
|Ground-level, underground access
|style="text-align:right;"|1.8
|style="text-align:right;"|14.4
|
<li>  Line 1 (out of service)
<li>  Line 9
<li>  Line A
<li> Pantitlán
<li>  Line 4 (Alameda Oriente branch): Pantitlán station
<li>  Line III: Pantitlán station (temporary Line1 service)
<li> Route: 168 (also temporary Line1 service)
<li>  Line 2: Pantitlán stop
<li> Routes: 11-B, 11-C, 19-F, 19-G
|}

Ridership
According to the data provided by the authorities since the 2000s, Line 5 is one of the least used of the system. In 2019, the line registered 86,512,999 entrances, averaging 237,021 commuters per day. Pantitlán is the busiest station on the line—and one of the busiest of the system—averaging 100,260 entrances that year; in contrast Consulado, Hangares and Valle Gómez stations averaged fewer than 5,000 passengers per year and consistently rank among the least used on the Metro network.

See also 
 List of Mexico City Metro lines

Notes

References

External links 
 

1981 establishments in Mexico
Railway lines opened in 1981
5